Steinish (IPA:[ˈʃtʰʲeɲɪʃ]) is a village in the Scottish Outer Hebrides, on the Isle of Lewis, near Plasterfield and Stornoway Airport. Steinish is situated within the parish of Stornoway, and is also situated adjacent to the Laxdale estuary. A treasure trove was discovered in Steinish, in 1876, containing coins from the era of Francis and Mary, Mary, and James VI.

Wildlife in the area includes the Arctic tern, the corn crake, the blackpoll warbler and the knot, as well as a sighting of the cattle egret.

References

External links

Canmore - Steinish site record

Villages in the Isle of Lewis